The Kabobo apalis (Apalis kaboboensis) is a species of bird in the family Cisticolidae. It is endemic to the Itombwe Mountains in eastern Democratic Republic of the Congo. Its natural habitat is tropical moist montane forests.

Originally described as a distinct species, it was later treated as a subspecies of the chestnut-throated apalis. It is now again treated as a separate species.

References

Kakobo apalis
Birds of Central Africa
Endemic fauna of the Democratic Republic of the Congo
Kakobo apalis
Taxonomy articles created by Polbot